Fairview is an unincorporated community in Chicot County, Arkansas, United States. The community is located on Lake Chicot about four miles southeast of Lake Village at the intersection of US Routes 65 and 82.

References

Unincorporated communities in Arkansas
Unincorporated communities in Chicot County, Arkansas